Brian Biggs (born March 9, 1968, in Little Rock, Arkansas) is a children's book author and illustrator. He has been published by HarperCollins and Random House, among others, and has illustrated two Little Golden Books.

Early work 
Brian Biggs got his start as a cartoonist for the North Texas Daily, the school newspaper of the North Texas State University. His comic, Roommates, ran until his transfer to Parsons. Then, in the 1990s, Biggs began to draw comic books, often as a part of the 90's underground comix scene. Notable works from this period include Frederick and Eloise (1999), published by Fantagraphics, and Dear Julia (1996–97), published by Black Eye Productions. Dear Julia was later made into a short film directed by Isaac E. Gozin.

Children's books 

Brian Biggs later began to illustrate for small projects, and eventually illustrated a children's book series, Shredderman, written by Wendelin Van Draanen in 2004-05, which was turned into the Nickelodeon TV film Shredderman Rules. The success of Shredderman led him to do more books, such as the Roscoe Riley Rules book series and Brownie & Pearl, written by Cynthia Rylant. He became known for his distinctive style, with thick, rough outlines and his bright digital coloring.

He has recently written and illustrated his own book series, titled  Everything Goes, and is currently the illustrator of Jon Scieszka's book series Frank Einstein. In 2016, the first books of his Tinyville Town series will be published.

Personal life 
In 1987, Brian Biggs attended North Texas State University, later transferring to the Parsons School of Design. He moved to San Francisco in 1993. He has lived and worked in Philadelphia since 1999.

Books 
Dear Julia, 1996 (Graphic Novel) Black Eye Productions, 
Frederick & Eloise: A Love Story 1997 (Graphic Novel) Fantagraphics, 
Un Mode de Transport, 2004 (Book [French]) Éditions du Rouergue, 
Shredderman series, written by Wendelin Van Draanen—2004-2006 (Children's Novel) Knopf, 
Goofball Malone series, written by Stephen Mooser (Children's Book) Grosset & Dunlap, 
One Beastly Beast: Two Aliens, Three Inventors, Four Fantastic Tales written by Garth Nix—2007 (Children's Short Story Collection) HarperCollins, 
Camp Out!: The Ultimate Kids' Guide written by Lynn Brunelle—2007 (Children's Guidebook) Workman Publishing, 
Beastly Rhymes to Read After Dark written by Judy Sierra—2008 (Children's Poems) Knopf, 

Everything Goes: Blue Bus, Red Balloon: A Book of Colors, HarperCollins, 2013, 

Everything Goes: By Sea, HarperCollins, 2013,

References 

Living people
Writers from Little Rock, Arkansas
1968 births
American children's writers
20th-century American male writers
21st-century American male writers
American children's book illustrators
Artists from Little Rock, Arkansas
20th-century American male artists
21st-century American male artists
Parsons School of Design alumni